Trenčín District ( (or Trenčiansky okres)) is a district in the Trenčín Region of northwestern Slovakia. It borders the districts of Bánovce nad Bebravou, Nové Mesto nad Váhom, and Ilava. In the northwest, the Slovak state border also forms the border of the Trenčín district.

History
Until 1918, the district was part of the county of Kingdom of Hungary of Trencsén.

Geography
The central part of the district, the Trenčianska kotlina basin and a part of the Ilavská kotlina basin are skirted by the White Carpathians to the west and the Strážov Mountains and the Považský Inovec in the east.

Economy
The most important industries are engineering and electrical engineering. In the past also the textile and clothing industries were of importance. In the Trenčianske Teplice spa locomotive and nervous system diseases are treated.

Municipalities
The district consists of 3 towns and 34 municipalities. The district seat is Trenčín, which is also the oldest (founded in 1111) and most populous town of the district with 55,698 inhabitants in 2015. The smallest municipality is Petrova Lehota with 183 inhabitants. The youngest municipality is Štvrtok, which was founded in 1477.

Adamovské Kochanovce
Bobot
Dolná Poruba
Dolná Súča
Drietoma
Dubodiel
Horná Súča
Horňany
Horné Srnie
Hrabovka
Chocholná-Velčice
Ivanovce
Kostolná-Záriečie
Krivosúd-Bodovka
Melčice-Lieskové
Mníchova Lehota
Motešice
Nemšová
Neporadza
Omšenie
Opatovce
Petrova Lehota
Selec
Skalka nad Váhom
Soblahov
Svinná
Štvrtok
Trenčianska Teplá
Trenčianska Turná
Trenčianske Jastrabie
Trenčianske Mitice
Trenčianske Stankovce
Trenčianske Teplice
Trenčín
Veľká Hradná
Veľké Bierovce
Zamarovce

References

Districts of Slovakia
Trenčín Region